A marital life estate is, in the common law tradition of the United States and Great Britain, a life estate held by a living spouse (husband or wife) or widowed spouse, for the duration of that spouse's life.

Creation
The marital life estate may be created by operation of law, agreement, contract, will, deed, or court order, such as a divorce decree or judgment.

See also
 Life interest
 Tenancy by the entirety
 Community property

References

Real property law
Inheritance
Widowhood
Common law